The Habeas Corpus Suspension Act 1817 (57 Geo. III, c. 3) was an Act passed by the British Parliament.

The Home Secretary, Lord Sidmouth, introduced the second reading of the Bill on 24 February 1817. In his speech he said there was "a traitorous conspiracy...for the purpose of overthrowing...the established government" and referred to "a malignant spirit which had brought such disgrace upon the domestic character of the people" and "had long prevailed in the country, but especially since the commencement of the French Revolution". This spirit belittled Britain's victories and exalted the prowess of her enemies and after the war had fomented discontent and encouraged violence: "An organised system has been established in every quarter, under the semblance of demanding parliamentary reform, but many of them, I am convinced, have that specious pretext in their mouths only, but revolution and rebellion in their hearts".

The Act was renewed later in the parliamentary session (57 Geo. III, c. 55). In autumn 1817 Sidmouth went through the list of all those detained under the Act and released as many as possible, personally interviewing most of the prisoners. He also tried to alleviate some of their conditions: "Solitary confinement will not be continued except under special circumstances". The Act was repealed in February 1818 by the Habeas Corpus Suspension Act 1818 (58 Geo. III, c. 1).

See also
Habeas Corpus
Habeas Corpus Suspension Act
Treason Act 1817
Seditious Meetings Act 1817

Notes

References

United Kingdom Acts of Parliament 1817
United Kingdom Acts of Parliament 1818
Habeas corpus
Repealed United Kingdom Acts of Parliament